Heuston is a surname. Notable people with the surname include:

Robert Heuston, (1923-1995), British legal scholar and legal historian
Seán Heuston, (1891-1916), Irish rebel leader

See also
Heuston railway station, a Dublin railway station named after Seán Heuston
Seán Heuston Bridge, a cast iron bridge spanning the River Liffey beside Heuston Station, Dublin
Houstoun
Huston (disambiguation)
Houston (disambiguation)
Euston (disambiguation)